Mountain Tracks: Volume 4 is a progressive bluegrass live album by the Yonder Mountain String Band. It was released February 7, 2006 by Frog Pad Records. The album contains a DVD named The Europe Bootlegs which was recorded during the band's first tour of Europe in July 2003.

Track listing

Chart performance

Album

Personnel

Yonder Mountain String Band 

 Dave Johnston – banjo, vocals
 Jeff Austin – mandolin, vocals
 Ben Kaufmann – bass, vocals
 Adam Aijala – guitar, vocals

Technical 

 Kari Amundson – engineer, camera operator
 Matthew Gardner – technical advisor
 Simon Gardner – contributor
 Bobby Ray – engineer, camera operator
 Leland Russell – engineer, editing, mixing, camera operator, cinematography

References

External links 
 Yonder Mountain String Band Official Homepage
 Frog Pad Records Homepage

Yonder Mountain String Band albums
2006 live albums
Frog Pad Records live albums